Elric van Vuuren is a former South African rugby union player that played Currie Cup and Vodacom Cup rugby for the ,  and  between 2006 and 2015. He also made two appearances for the  during the 2013 Super Rugby season. His regular position was full-back, centre or fly-half.

He was included in the  squad for the 2013 Super Rugby season.

He retired from rugby union at the end of the 2015 season to take up a business opportunity in Port Elizabeth.

References

Living people
1985 births
South African rugby union players
Southern Kings players
Border Bulldogs players
SWD Eagles players
Rugby union players from Port Elizabeth
Rugby union fullbacks